The Sony FE 28-70mm F3.5-5.6 OSS is a full-frame (FE) variable maximum aperture standard zoom lens for Sony E-mount, announced by Sony on October 16, 2013. It was the first kit lens for Sony's full-frame E-mount (FE) system, and was released on the same day as the Sony α7 and Sony α7R. It is often bundled with various Sony E-mount full-frame mirrorless cameras, and is a less costly alternative to other standard zooms such as the Sony Carl Zeiss Vario-Tessar T* FE 24-70mm F4 ZA OSS.

Though designed for Sony's full frame E-mount cameras, the lens can be used on Sony's APS-C E-mount camera bodies, with an equivalent full-frame field-of-view of 42-105mm.

Construction
The lens has a weather resistant plastic construction with a matte-black finish and rubber zoom and focus rings. The barrel of the lens moves outward from the main lens body as it's zoomed in from 28mm to 70mm.

Optical properties
The Sony FE 28-70mm F3.5-5.6 OSS shows acceptable chromatic aberration and good bokeh. Corner sharpness becomes “acceptable” when the lens is stopped down to f/8. Natively, it suffers from fairly noticeable distortion - 2.5% barrel distortion at 28mm, 3.2% pincushion at 50mm and 3.7% pincushion at 70mm, and requires correction in-camera or in raw processing.

Its optical performance is competitive with the Sony Carl Zeiss Vario-Tessar T* FE 24-70mm F4 ZA OSS in every metric tested by DxOMark.

Autofocus
The lens focuses internally, using a linear autofocus motor. Its autofocus is “silent and accurate” and “very quick”.

See also
List of Sony E-mount lenses

References

Camera lenses introduced in 2013
28-70